The 2010 MTV Video Music Awards took place on September 12, 2010 at Nokia Theatre in Los Angeles, honoring the best music videos from the previous year. Chelsea Handler hosted the event, the first woman in sixteen years – since the 1994 MTV Video Music Awards – to do so.

Being nominated 13 times, Lady Gaga became the most-nominated artist in VMA history for a single year and subsequently became the first female artist to receive two nominations for Video of the Year when both "Bad Romance" and "Telephone" were nominated for the award. She was also the top winner of the night when "Telephone" won Best Collaboration and "Bad Romance" won seven separate awards including Video of the Year, bringing her total number of moonmen to eight. When she accepted her award for Video of the Year, she also announced the title of her second studio album, Born This Way and sang an excerpt from the title track. She accepted the award while wearing a dress complete with a hat, purse, and shoes all made entirely from cuts of raw meat which drew backlash from PETA.

Overall, the show grabbed 11.4 million viewers – the largest audience for a Video Music Awards show since 2002.

Performances

The house artist was Deadmau5. The following performed along with him:
Travie McCoy – "Billionaire"
Jason Derulo – "Ridin' Solo"
Robyn – "Dancing on My Own"

Outside in the parking lot there were the following performances:
N.E.R.D. and Ciara – "Hot-n-Fun"

Source: Performers

Awards
Winners are in bold text.

Video of the Year

Lady Gaga – "Bad Romance"
 B.o.B (featuring Hayley Williams) – "Airplanes"
 Eminem – "Not Afraid"
 Florence + the Machine – "Dog Days Are Over"
 Lady Gaga (featuring Beyoncé) – "Telephone"
 Thirty Seconds to Mars – "Kings and Queens"

Best Male Video
Eminem – "Not Afraid"
 B.o.B (featuring Hayley Williams) – "Airplanes"
 Jason Derulo – "In My Head"
 Drake – "Find Your Love"
 Usher (featuring will.i.am) – "OMG"

Best Female Video
Lady Gaga – "Bad Romance"
 Beyoncé (featuring Lady Gaga) – "Video Phone (Extended Remix)"
 Kesha – "Tik Tok"
 Katy Perry (featuring Snoop Dogg) – "California Gurls"
 Taylor Swift – "Fifteen"

Best New Artist
Justin Bieber (featuring Ludacris) – "Baby"
 Broken Bells – "The Ghost Inside"
 Jason Derulo – "In My Head"
 Kesha – "Tik Tok"
 Nicki Minaj (featuring Sean Garrett) – "Massive Attack"

Best Pop Video
Lady Gaga – "Bad Romance"
 B.o.B (featuring Bruno Mars) – "Nothin' on You"
 Beyoncé (featuring Lady Gaga) – "Video Phone (Extended Remix)"
 Kesha – "Tik Tok"
 Katy Perry (featuring Snoop Dogg) – "California Gurls"

Best Rock Video
Thirty Seconds to Mars – "Kings and Queens"
 Florence + the Machine – "Dog Days Are Over"
 MGMT – "Flash Delirium"
 Muse – "Uprising"
 Paramore – "Ignorance"

Best Hip-Hop Video
Eminem – "Not Afraid"
 B.o.B (featuring Hayley Williams) – "Airplanes"
 Drake (featuring Kanye West, Lil Wayne and Eminem) – "Forever"
 Jay-Z (featuring Swizz Beatz) – "On to the Next One"
 Kid Cudi (featuring MGMT and Ratatat) – "Pursuit of Happiness"

Best Dance Music Video
Lady Gaga – "Bad Romance"
 Cascada – "Evacuate the Dancefloor"
 David Guetta (featuring Akon) – "Sexy Chick"
 Enrique Iglesias (featuring Pitbull) – "I Like It" (Jersey Shore Version)
 Usher (featuring will.i.am) – "OMG"

Best Collaboration
 Lady Gaga (featuring Beyoncé) – "Telephone"
 3OH!3 (featuring Kesha) – "My First Kiss"
 Beyoncé (featuring Lady Gaga) – "Video Phone (Extended Remix)"
 B.o.B (featuring Hayley Williams) – "Airplanes"
 Jay-Z and Alicia Keys – "Empire State of Mind"

Breakthrough Video
The Black Keys – "Tighten Up"
 Dan Black – "Symphonies"
 Coldplay – "Strawberry Swing"
 Gorillaz (featuring Bobby Womack and Mos Def) – "Stylo"

Best Direction
Lady Gaga – "Bad Romance" (Director: Francis Lawrence)
 Eminem – "Not Afraid" (Director: Rich Lee)
 Jay-Z and Alicia Keys – "Empire State of Mind" (Director: Hype Williams)
 Pink – "Funhouse" (Director: Dave Meyers)
 Thirty Seconds to Mars – "Kings and Queens" (Director: Bartholomew Cubbins)

Best Choreography
Lady Gaga – "Bad Romance" (Choreographer: Laurieann Gibson)
 Beyoncé (featuring Lady Gaga) – "Video Phone (Extended Remix)" (Choreographers: Frank Gatson, Phlex and Bryan Tanaka)
 Lady Gaga (featuring Beyoncé) – "Telephone" (Choreographer: Laurieann Gibson)
 Janelle Monáe (featuring Big Boi) – "Tightrope" (Choreographers: Janelle Monáe and the Memphis Jookin Community)
 Usher (featuring will.i.am) – "OMG" (Choreographer: Aakomon “AJ” Jones)

Best Special Effects
Muse – "Uprising" (Special Effects: Humble and Sam Stephens)
 Dan Black – "Symphonies" (Special Effects: Corinne Bance and Axel D’Harcourt)
 Eminem – "Not Afraid" (Special Effects: Animaholics-VFX)
 Green Day – "21st Century Breakdown" (Special Effects: Laundry)
 Lady Gaga – "Bad Romance" (Special Effects: Skulley Effects VFX)

Best Art Direction
Florence + the Machine – "Dog Days Are Over" (Art Directors: Louise Corcoran and Aldene Johnson)
 Beyoncé (featuring Lady Gaga) – "Video Phone (Extended Remix)" (Art Director: Lenny Tso)
 Eminem – "Not Afraid" (Art Director: Ethan Tobman)
 Lady Gaga – "Bad Romance" (Art Director: Charles Infante)
 Thirty Seconds to Mars – "Kings and Queens" (Art Director: Marc Benacerraf)

Best Editing
Lady Gaga – "Bad Romance" (Editor: Jarrett Fijal)
 Eminem – "Not Afraid" (Editor: Ken Mowe)
 Miike Snow – "Animal" (Editor: Frank Macias)
 Pink – "Funhouse" (Editor: Chris Davis)
 Rihanna – "Rude Boy" (Editor: Clark Eddy)

Best Cinematography
Jay-Z and Alicia Keys – "Empire State of Mind" (Director of Photography: John Perez)
 Eminem – "Not Afraid" (Director of Photography: Christopher Probst)
 Florence + the Machine – "Dog Days Are Over" (Director of Photography: Adam Frisch)
 Lady Gaga – "Bad Romance" (Director of Photography: Thomas Kloss)
 Mumford & Sons – "Little Lion Man" (Director of Photography: Ben Magahy)

Latino Artist of the Year
Aventura
 Camila
 Daddy Yankee
 Pitbull
 Shakira
 Wisin & Yandel

Appearances

Pre-show
 Sway Calloway – presented Best Dance Music Video and Best Collaboration

Main show
 Lindsay Lohan, Rick Ross, Flo Rida and Lil Jon – appeared in the opening sketch
 Ellen DeGeneres – presented Best Female Video
 Kim Kardashian – introduced Justin Bieber
 The cast of Jackass 3D – presented Best Rock Video
 Kesha and Trey Songz – introduced Usher
 Katy Perry and Nicki Minaj – presented Best Male Video
 Jared Leto and Ashley Greene – introduced Florence and the Machine
 Cory Monteith, Chris Colfer, Amber Riley and Jane Lynch – presented Best Pop Video
 Rosario Dawson and Chris Pine – introduced Taylor Swift
 Jesse Eisenberg, Andrew Garfield and Justin Timberlake – introduced Drake, Mary J. Blige and Swizz Beatz
 Joe Manganiello and Evan Rachel Wood – introduced the winners of the professional categories
 The cast of Jersey Shore – appeared in an on-stage skit with host
 Sofía Vergara – presented Best Hip-Hop Video
 Selena Gomez and Ne-Yo – introduced B.o.B, Bruno Mars and Paramore
 Romeo and Victoria Justice – presented Best New Artist
 Emma Stone and Penn Badgley – introduced Linkin Park
 Cher – presented Video of the Year
 Aziz Ansari – introduced Kanye West

Source: presenters

Controversy

will.i.am's blackface criticism
Some viewers took offense to the producer/ rapper will.i.am's outfit, especially the dark makeup, which, to some fans, was reminiscent of the antiquated, racially charged practice of blackface. After fans blasted the rapper online, he took to Twitter to defend the look as artistic expression and not an embrace of the controversial maquillage typically used to lampoon African-Americans. Will.i.am responded to the backlash on his Twitter stating "1st. just because I where all black including head mask as expression and emphasize my outfit, it shouldn't be looked at as racial," Will tweeted. "Let go of the past. there are far more important things 2 bark about. (Jobs, health, education) not a black man wearing all black everything." Will.i.am insisted the face paint was a harmless costume choice and that fans concerned with the image Will's look projected should focus on larger issues.

Lady Gaga's meat dress

While accepting her award for Video of the Year, presented by legendary singer and actress Cher, Lady Gaga wore a dress made entirely from cuts of raw meat. The dress bore a resemblance to an artwork, Vanitas: Flesh Dress for an Albino Anorectic, created by Canadian artist Jana Sterbak in 1987. Along with the dress, her hat, shoes, and purse were all made from meat as well. PETA president Ingrid Newkirk issued a statement concerning the controversial outfit. After questioning whether the meat was real or not, Newkirk was quick to disparage Gaga saying, "Meat is the decomposing flesh of a tormented animal who didn't want to die, and after a few hours under the TV lights, it would smell like the rotting flesh it is and likely be crawling in maggots--not too attractive, really." Franc Fernandez, the designer of the meat dress, said later in an interview with MTV, “...it's not a sticky meat. It's not a messy dress at all, surprisingly. [...] It's actually very clean meat, very sturdy and strong and doesn't run at all. [...] The meat dries out, rather than rotting. It becomes jerky.” Gaga later explained to Ellen DeGeneres that the outfit exhibited her disapproval with the United States military's Don't ask, don't tell policy and further clarified, "If we don't stand up for what we believe in and if we don't fight for our rights, pretty soon we're going to have as much rights as the meat on our own bones. And I am not a piece of meat."  She also commented on the outfit's nature, "...it is certainly no disrespect to anyone that is vegan or vegetarian. As you know, I am the most judgment-free human being on the earth." Afterwards, DeGeneres, who is a vegan, jokingly gave Gaga a bikini and skirt made from lettuce and other various vegetables.

See also
 2010 MTV Europe Music Awards

References

External links
Official VMA 2010 site

2010
MTV Video Music Awards
MTV Video Music
MTV Video Music Awards
2010 in Los Angeles